Trisha Chetty (born 26 June 1988) is a South African cricketer.  She has played two Tests, and made one hundred and twenty limited-overs appearances for South Africa since 2007. She plays as a wicket-keeper and right-handed batter. On 17 March 2023, she announced her retirement from all formats of cricket.

Career
She along with Shandre Fritz set the record for the highest ever opening stand of 170 runs in the history of WT20I history She also holds the record of highest dismissal by a wicketkeeper in Women's ODI.

In February 2018, she played in her 100th Women's One Day International match for South Africa, against India. The following month, she was one of fourteen players to be awarded a national contract by Cricket South Africa ahead of the 2018–19 season. However, in May 2018, she was dropped from South Africa's squad, ahead of their tour to England in June.

In October 2018, she was named in South Africa's squad for the 2018 ICC Women's World Twenty20 tournament in the West Indies. However, after the start of the tournament, she was ruled out of South Africa's squad due to an injury and was replaced by Faye Tunnicliffe.

In September 2019, she was named in the F van der Merwe XI squad for the inaugural edition of the Women's T20 Super League in South Africa. In January 2020, she was named in South Africa's squad for the 2020 ICC Women's T20 World Cup in Australia. On 23 July 2020, Chetty was named in South Africa's 24-woman squad to begin training in Pretoria, ahead of their tour to England.

In February 2022, she was named in South Africa's team for the 2022 Women's Cricket World Cup in New Zealand. In July 2022, she was named in South Africa's team for the cricket tournament at the 2022 Commonwealth Games in Birmingham, England. However, she was later ruled out of the tournament due to injury.

References

External links

1988 births
Living people
Cricketers from Durban
East Coast women cricketers
Central Gauteng women cricketers
KwaZulu-Natal Coastal women cricketers
KwaZulu-Natal Inland women cricketers
South African women cricketers
South Africa women Test cricketers
South Africa women One Day International cricketers
South Africa women Twenty20 International cricketers
South African people of Indian descent
Wicket-keepers